Gambling Ship may refer to:
 Gambling ship
 Gambling Ship (1933 film), an American Pre-Code drama film
 Gambling Ship (1938 film), an American mystery film